Cassi Hill is a residential area in the United States Virgin Islands. It is located on the island of Saint Thomas.

Populated places in Saint Thomas, U.S. Virgin Islands